The Unicorn is a 2018 American comedy film directed by Robert Schwartzman and starring Lauren Lapkus, Nick Rutherford, Lucy Hale, Beck Bennett, Dree Hemingway, Darrell Britt-Gibson, Maya Kazan, John Kapelos, Beverly D'Angelo, and Kyle Mooney. Its screenplay was written by Nick Rutherford, Kirk C. Johnson, and Will Elliott, from a story by Schwartzman.

It had its world premiere at South by Southwest on March 10, 2018 and was released on February 1, 2019, by The Orchard.

Premise
An engaged couple look to reenergize their relationship by having a threesome.

Cast
 Lauren Lapkus as Malory
 Nick Rutherford as Caleb
 Lucy Hale as Jesse
 Beck Bennett as Tyson
 Dree Hemingway as April
 Darrell Britt-Gibson as Charlie
 Maya Kazan as Katie
 John Kapelos as Louis
 Beverly D'Angelo as Edie
 Kyle Mooney as Gabe
 Brittany Furlan as Samantha
 Jeff Grace as Bartender 
 Elizabeth Ruscio as Aunt Becky

Production
In July 2017, it was announced Lauren Lapkus, Nick Rutherford, Lucy Hale, Beck Bennett, Dree Hemingway, Darrell Britt-Gibson, Maya Kazan, John Kapelos, and Beverly D'Angelo had been cast in the film, with Rutherford writing the script alongside Kirk C. Johnson and Will Elliott, from a story by Robert Schwartzman who would also direct the film. Schwartzman would serve as a producer on the film alongside Russell Wayne Groves, while Bret Disend, Al Di, Mark Weiss, Jessica James, and Bo An would serve as executive producers.

Release
The film had its world premiere at South by Southwest on March 10, 2018. Shortly after, Screen Media Films acquired U.S. distribution rights to the film. However, The Orchard acquired U.S. distribution rights to the film. It was released on February 1, 2019.

Reception

References

External links
 
 

2018 films
American comedy films
American independent films
Films directed by Robert Schwartzman
The Orchard (company) films
2010s English-language films
2010s American films